The eleventh season of the One Piece anime series was produced by Toei Animation, and directed by Hiroaki Miyamoto based on Eiichiro Oda's manga by the same name. The majority of the season covers the "Sabaody Archipelago" story arc, which deals with the Straw Hats preparing to enter Fishman Island by having their ship coated for undersea travel. During their stay, they meet an old enemy Hatchan, his friends Keimi and Papaggu, and the first mate of Gold Roger, Silvers Rayleigh, as well as 9 rookie pirates known as the "11 Supernovas". In an incident involving the auction of Keimi, the crew and the pirates are attacked by top members of the Marines, including Bartholomew Kuma, one of the Seven Warlords of the Sea. The final two episodes continue the "History Drama Boss Luffy" story established in the fourth TV Special and featured in the ninth season.

The season aired on Fuji Television from December 21, 2008 to June 28, 2009 and consisted of 26 episodes. The first two DVD compilations of the series were released on January 7, 2011 with two individual volumes released monthly and the last DVD compilations were released on March 2, 2011. This season's episode count and title were announced in the One Piece Movie 10 Guide Book, "One Piece-Pia".<ref name="OPPia">Eiichiro Oda (2009). 'One Piece-Pia, p. 75-77. Fuji Television/Toei Animation., Japan.  / 9784835612966.</ref> 

The season uses two different pieces of theme music. The first opening, a cover version of the first opening theme  by Hiroshi Kitadani, is performed by TVXQ, as "We Are! (Animation One Piece 10th Anniversary Ver.)", who also performs the season's second opening theme, titled "Share the World", starting with episode 395 onwards.



Episode list

Home releases
Japanese

English
In North America, the season was recategorized as the end of "Season Six" and the beginning of "Season Seven" for its DVD release by Funimation Entertainment. The Australian Season sets were renamed Collection 31 though 33''.

References

2008 Japanese television seasons
2009 Japanese television seasons
One Piece seasons
One Piece episodes